Bilateral relations exist between Austria and the Philippines.

History

Austrian presence in the Philippines has been established as early as 1871, with the establishment of an Austro-Hungarian honorary consulate in Manila. Austria had a profound impact on Filipinos as the Philippine National Hero Jose Rizal had a deep friendship with the Austrian-Bohemian anthropologist Ferdinand Blumentritt. 

Formal diplomatic relations between Austria and the Philippines was established on October 17, 1946. In 1973, the Philippines opened its resident embassy in Vienna. Prior to that, Philippine interests in Austria was represented under the Philippine Embassy in Bern, Switzerland.

Austria established its own embassy in Manila in 1982.

Labor relations
As of 2014, there are about 35,000 Filipinos in Austria, most of them involved in the health and service sector. An estimated amount of 90 percent of the Filipinos in Austria are employed as nurses and midwives in hospital and homes of elderly people throughout Austria. Filipino nurses started to flock to Austria as early as on the 1970s.

Literature
 Maria Zeneida Angara Collinson, et al.: Philippine-Austria Relations: 500 years. Embassy of the Republic of the Philippines in Austria, 2017.

See also
Foreign relations of Austria 
Foreign relations of the Philippines
Filipinos in Austria

References

 
Philippines
Austria